The 2005 League of Ireland First Division season was the 21st season of the League of Ireland First Division.

Overview
The First Division was contested by 10 teams and Sligo Rovers won the division, finishing two points clear of Dublin City. Each team played the other teams four times, totalling 36 games.

Final table

Promotion/relegation play-off
Dublin City who finished second in the First Division played off against Shamrock Rovers who finished eleventh in the Premier Division.
1st Leg

2nd Leg

Dublin City win 3–2 on aggregate and are promoted to the Premier Division.

Top scorers

See also
 2005 League of Ireland Premier Division
 2005 League of Ireland Cup

References

League of Ireland First Division seasons
2005 League of Ireland
2005 in Republic of Ireland association football leagues
Ireland
Ireland